Catholic guilt is the reported excess guilt felt by Catholics and lapsed Catholics. Guilt is a by-product of an informed conscience but "Catholic" guilt is often confused with scrupulosity. An overly scrupulous conscience is an exaggeration of healthy guilt.  Guilt is not considered a positive thing in itself in any Catholic teaching; rather, contrition is considered constructive.

Guilt is remorse for having committed some offense or wrong, real or imagined. It is related to, although distinguishable from, "shame", in that the former involves an awareness of causing injury to another, while the latter arises from the consciousness of something dishonorable, improper, or ridiculous, done by oneself. One might feel guilty for having hurt someone, and also ashamed of oneself for having done so. Philip Yancey compares guilt to the sensation of physical pain as an indication that something should not be ignored but attended to. Rabbi David Wolpe says, "Facing up to the hurt we cause others with cruel speech or callous acts, and to our myriad failures to meet the marks God sets for living a true and good life, "makes forgiveness meaningful, not merely a catchphrase".

The Penitential Act at the beginning of Mass is a liturgical rudiment of this previously sacramental Confession. Private confession to an ordained priest became the normal form of this sacrament, with a strict seal of secrecy on the part of the priest. Sometimes, the practice of the sacrament emphasized doing acts of penance, or making one's sorrow or contrition authentic. Sometimes, it emphasized confessing all of one's serious or “mortal” sins, sometimes it emphasized the power of the priest, acting In persona Christi, to absolve the penitent of sins. Currently, there are forms that include one-on-one Confession to a priest, or communal preparation preceding a one-on-one Confession.

Examples 
Evelyn Waugh's Brideshead Revisited involves guilt in the Catholic religion. Distressed by her romantic relationship with Charles Ryder, Julia Flyte exclaims: "I saw to-day there was one thing unforgivable […]; to set up a rival good to God's. […] it may be a private bargain between me and God, that if I give up this one thing I want so much, however bad I am, He won't quite despair of me in the end."

The subject is treated humorously in the 30 Rock episode "The Fighting Irish". Catholic guilt is described by Jack Donaghy (Alec Baldwin): "That's not how it works, Tracy. Even though there is the whole confession thing, that's no free pass, because there is a crushing guilt that comes with being a Catholic. Whether things are good or bad or you're simply... eating tacos in the park, there is always the crushing guilt".

Research 

Guilt can be viewed in terms of constructiveness versus destructiveness: "constructive guilt" is focused on forgiving one's ethical lapses and changing one's behavior, while "destructive guilt" remains mired in self-loathing and does not emphasize learning from one's wrongdoings and moving ahead with life. A study in Psychology of Religion found that Catholic participants demonstrated a higher level of constructive guilt reactions than other groups. Research on a link between Catholicism and guilt appears to be inconclusive.

Guilt is an important factor in perpetuating obsessive–compulsive disorder symptoms. Research is mixed on the possible connection between Catholicism and obsessive-compulsive symptoms. A study of 165 individuals by the University of Parma found that religious individuals scored higher on measures of control of thoughts and overimportance of thoughts, and that these measures were associated with obsessive-compulsive symptoms only in the religious participants. Another study noted a link between intrinsic religiosity and obsessive–compulsive cognitions/behaviors only among Catholic participants. However, a study from Boston University found that no particular religion was more common among OCD patients, and that OCD patients were no more religious than other subjects with anxiety. Religious obsessions were connected to the participants' religiosity, but sexual and aggressive symptoms were not. Greater religious devotion among OCD patients was correlated with increased guilt.

A study in American Behavioral Scientist analyzed interviews with participants from Catholic, Jewish, and Protestant backgrounds. The author reported that most participants "eagerly described an experience of guilt."

Ulster University students participated in a study that found a slightly higher level of collective guilt among the Catholic students than the Protestant students.

Researchers from the University of California, Berkeley and from the University of Notre Dame examined the concept of Catholic guilt among American teenagers. The authors found no evidence of Catholic guilt in this population, noting that Catholicism both caused and relieved less guilt than other religious traditions. The authors found no evidence that Catholic teenagers experience more guilt than non-Catholic ones. The authors did not find that more observant Catholics feel guiltier than less observant Catholics.  The study also noted no difference in the effect of guilt-inducing behaviors on Catholic versus non-Catholic participants.

A study from Hofstra University reported no difference in total guilt among religions, although religiosity itself was connected to guilt.

See also 
 Guilt society
 Guilt trip
 On the Genealogy of Morality
 Scrupulosity
 Sin
 Victim soul

References

Further reading

External links
 Egan. Timothy. "The End of Catholic Guilt", The New York Times, April 15, 2016

Guilt
Stereotypes
Catholic spirituality
Catholic culture
Culture-bound syndromes